Garovaglia is a genus of mosses in the family Ptychomniaceae.

The genus name of Garovaglia is in honour of Santo Garovaglio (1805 - 1882), who was an Italian botanist (Mycology and Bryology), Professor of Natural History at the University of Pavia.

The genus was circumscribed by Vittore Benedetto Antonio Trevisan de Saint-Léon in Caratt. Tre Nuov. Gen. Collem. Vol.1 in 1853, then in Biblioth. Lichenol. Vol.107 on page 41 in 2012 (Secondary Literature).

Species 
Garovaglia angustifolia - Garovaglia aristata - Garovaglia baeuerlenii - Garovaglia binsteadii - Garovaglia brassii - Garovaglia compressa - Garovaglia crispa - Garovaglia crispata - Garovaglia eberhardtii - Garovaglia elegans - Garovaglia luzonensis - Garovaglia mujuensis - Garovaglia plicata (type) - Garovaglia plumosa - Garovaglia powellii - Garovaglia robbinsii - Garovaglia subelegans - Garovaglia tortifolia - Garovaglia zantenii

References

External links 
 
 
 
 Garovaglia at Tropicos

Moss genera
Ptychomniales